The Convention for the Suppression of the Traffic in Persons and of the Exploitation of the Prostitution of Others was approved by the United Nations General Assembly on 2 December 1949, and entered into force on 25 July 1951. The preamble states:

"Whereas prostitution and the accompanying evil of the traffic in persons for the purpose of prostitution are incompatible with the dignity and worth of the human person and endanger the welfare of the individual, the family, and the community"

As of December 2013, 82 states were party to the convention (see map). An additional 13 states had signed the convention, but had not yet ratified it.

The Convention supersedes a number of earlier conventions that covered some aspects of forced prostitution. Signatories are charged with three obligations under the 1949 Convention: prohibition of trafficking, specific administrative and enforcement measures, and social measures aimed at trafficked persons. The 1949 Convention presents two shifts in perspective of the trafficking problem, in that it views prostitutes as victims of the procurers, and in that it eschews the terms "white slave traffic" and "women", using for the first time race- and gender-neutral language. To fall under the provisions of the 1949 Convention, the trafficking need not cross international lines.

Provisions
The Convention requires state parties to punish any person who "procures, entices, or leads away, for purposes of prostitution, another person, even with the consent of that person", "exploits the prostitution of another person, even with the consent of that person" (Article 1), or runs a brothel or rents accommodations for prostitution purposes (Article 2). It also prescribes procedures for combating international traffic for the purpose of prostitution, including extradition of offenders.

Furthermore, state parties are required to abolish all regulations that subject prostitutes "to special registration or to the possession of a special document or to any exceptional requirements for supervision or notification" (Article 6). And also, they are required to take the necessary measure for the supervision of employment agencies in order to prevent persons seeking employment, in particular women and children, from being exposed to the danger of prostitution (Article 20).

A dispute between the parties relating to the interpretation or application of the Convention may, at the request of any one of the parties to the dispute, be referred to the International Court of Justice (Article 22).

Status
A number of countries who have ratified the Convention expressed reservations in relation to the referral of disputes to the ICJ, and some countries have not ratified the Convention at all because of their objection to the presence of the article.

One of the main reasons the Convention has not been ratified by many countries is that it also applies to voluntary prostitution, because of the presence of the term "even with the consent of that person" in Article 1. For example, in countries such as Germany, the Netherlands, New Zealand, Greece, Turkey, and other countries, voluntary prostitution is legal and regulated as an "occupation".

The Trafficking protocol (2000) to the United Nations Convention against Transnational Organized Crime has used a different definition of "trafficking" to that in the 1949 Convention, and has been ratified by many more countries.

The Centre for Human Rights, specifically the secretariat of the Working Group on Slavery, in close co-operation with the Centre for Social Development and Humanitarian Affairs of the Department of International Economic and Social Affairs, actively monitors the Convention.

See also
1921 International Convention for the Suppression of the Traffic in Women and Children
Human trafficking
Prostitution law
Sexual slavery
International Day for the Abolition of Slavery
International Abolitionist Federation

References

Convention for the Suppression of the Traffic in Persons and of the Exploitation of the Prostitution of Others
Convention for the Suppression of the Traffic in Persons and of the Exploitation of the Prostitution of Others
United Nations treaties
Treaties concluded in 1949
Treaties entered into force in 1951
Child labour treaties
Human trafficking treaties
Treaties of the Democratic Republic of Afghanistan
Treaties of the People's Socialist Republic of Albania
Treaties of Algeria
Treaties of Argentina
Treaties of Azerbaijan
Treaties of Bangladesh
Treaties of the Byelorussian Soviet Socialist Republic
Treaties of Belgium
Treaties of Bolivia
Treaties of Bosnia and Herzegovina
Treaties of the Second Brazilian Republic
Treaties of the People's Republic of Bulgaria
Treaties of Burkina Faso
Treaties of Cameroon
Treaties of the Central African Republic
Treaties of the Republic of the Congo
Treaties of Ivory Coast
Treaties of Croatia
Treaties of Cuba
Treaties of Cyprus
Treaties of Czechoslovakia
Treaties of the Czech Republic
Treaties of Djibouti
Treaties of Ecuador
Treaties of the United Arab Republic
Treaties of the Derg
Treaties of Finland
Treaties of France
Treaties of Guatemala
Treaties of Guinea
Treaties of Haiti
Treaties of Honduras
Treaties of the Hungarian People's Republic
Treaties of India
Treaties of the Kingdom of Iraq
Treaties of Israel
Treaties of Italy
Treaties of Japan
Treaties of Jordan
Treaties of Kazakhstan
Treaties of Kuwait
Treaties of Kyrgyzstan
Treaties of Laos
Treaties of Latvia
Treaties of Lesotho
Treaties of the Kingdom of Libya
Treaties of Luxembourg
Treaties of Malawi
Treaties of Mali
Treaties of Mauritania
Treaties of Mexico
Treaties of Montenegro
Treaties of the Federated States of Micronesia
Treaties of Morocco
Treaties of Nepal
Treaties of Niger
Treaties of Norway
Treaties of Pakistan
Treaties of the Philippines
Treaties of the Polish People's Republic
Treaties of Portugal
Treaties of South Korea
Treaties of the Socialist Republic of Romania
Treaties of the Soviet Union
Treaties of Rwanda
Treaties of Senegal
Treaties of Serbia and Montenegro
Treaties of Seychelles
Treaties of Singapore
Treaties of Slovakia
Treaties of Slovenia
Treaties of the Union of South Africa
Treaties of Francoist Spain
Treaties of the Dominion of Ceylon
Treaties of Tajikistan
Treaties of North Macedonia
Treaties of Togo
Treaties of the Ukrainian Soviet Socialist Republic
Treaties of Uzbekistan
Treaties of Venezuela
Treaties of the Yemen Arab Republic
Treaties of Yugoslavia
Treaties of Zimbabwe
Convention for the Suppression of the Traffic in Persons and of the Exploitation of the Prostitution of Others
Treaties adopted by United Nations General Assembly resolutions
Treaties extended to Curaçao and Dependencies